This is a list of animated television series first aired in 1999.

Anime television series first aired in 1999

See also
 List of animated feature films of 1999
 List of Japanese animation television series of 1999

References

Television series
Animated series
1999
1999
1999-related lists